Mirador de la Flor is a monument in Corpus Christi, Texas, that honors Tejano musician Selena Quintanilla-Pérez, who was murdered in 1995 at age 23. About 30,000 people visit the monument every year. It is located a few miles north of Selena's burial site at Sea Side Memorial Park, and features a life-sized bronze statue of the singer, sculpted by Corpus Christi native H.W. "Buddy" Tatum. Selena's statue leans against a concrete pillar, looking towards the Corpus Christi Bay.

The monument also features a motif of white roses, said to be Selena's favorite, and a memorial plaque facing Shoreline Boulevard.

References

External links 

1997 establishments in Texas
1997 sculptures
Bronze sculptures in Texas
Buildings and structures completed in 1997
Buildings and structures in Corpus Christi, Texas
Cultural depictions of Selena
Culture of Corpus Christi, Texas
Monuments and memorials in Texas
Sculptures of women in Texas
Statues in Texas
Statues of musicians in the United States
Tejano culture
Tourist attractions in Corpus Christi, Texas